The 1994 Portuguese Grand Prix (formally the XXIII Grande Premio de Portugal) was a Formula One motor race held on 25 September 1994 at the Autódromo do Estoril. It was the thirteenth race of the 1994 Formula One World Championship.

The 71-lap race was won by Damon Hill, driving a Williams-Renault. Teammate David Coulthard finished second, achieving his first podium finish, with Mika Häkkinen third in a McLaren-Peugeot. The win, Hill's fifth of the season and third in succession, enabled him to move within one point of Drivers' Championship leader Michael Schumacher, while the 1-2 finish allowed Williams to take over the lead of the Constructors' Championship from Benetton.

Weekend report before qualifying 
Team Lotus had rehired Philippe Adams to partner with Johnny Herbert due to financial issues. Meanwhile with Michael Schumacher still banned, the Benetton team had continued to run with JJ Lehto for another race with Jos Verstappen.

Qualifying 
During free practice, Damon Hill collided with Eddie Irvine's Jordan after Irvine spun, and was rolled over by the impact. Hill was unhurt but his Williams FW16 needed repairs. Gerhard Berger took pole position for Ferrari ahead of Hill, David Coulthard in the other Williams and Hakkinen 4th in the leading McLaren-Peugeot. Alesi was 5th in the second Ferrari, Ukyo Katayama was 6th for Tyrrell-Yamaha, and the top 10 was completed by Brundle 7th in the second McLaren-Peugeot, Barrichello 8th for Jordan ahead of Frentzen 9th for Sauber and Jos Verstappen 10th for Benetton.

Race 
Gerhard Berger led in the early stages for Ferrari, ahead of Coulthard who had got ahead of Hill on the start. Berger retired on lap 8 with his gearbox failed, and Katayama's gearbox also failed by lap 27, which promoted Rubens Barrichello into the points for Jordan. Coulthard ran wide whilst trying to lap a backmarker on lap 33 which allowed Hill to edge ahead of the Scotsman. By lap 39 the other Ferrari of Jean Alesi had retired after colliding with the Simtek of David Brabham while trying to lap him. Soon afterwards, Jos Verstappen was able to pass Martin Brundle's McLaren for 5th. Damon Hill went on to take his third consecutive race win, ahead of Coulthard. The 1-2 finish gave Williams the lead in the Constructors Championship. Mika Hakkinen finished third for McLaren, Barrichello 4th for Jordan, Verstappen 5th for Benetton and Martin Brundle 6th in the second McLaren. Olivier Panis originally finished 9th but was disqualified for having illegal skidblock wear.

Classification

Qualifying

Race

Championship standings after the race

Drivers' Championship standings

Constructors' Championship standings

References

Portuguese Grand Prix
Portuguese Grand Prix
Portuguese Grand Prix
Portuguese Grand Prix